The 2003-04 Croatian Ice Hockey League season was the 13th season of the Croatian Ice Hockey League, the top level of ice hockey in Croatia. Two teams, KHL Medveščak Zagreb, and KHL Zagreb participated in the league, and KHL Medveščak Zagreb won the championship.

Final

 KHL Medveščak Zagreb – KHL Zagreb 3:0 (10:3, 6:3, 7:2)

External links 
 Season on hockeyarchives.info

Croatian Ice Hockey League
1
Croatian Ice Hockey League seasons